The Communications and Multimedia Act 1998, is a Malaysian law which enacted to provide for and to regulate the converging communications and multimedia industries, and for incidental matters.

Structure
The Communications and Multimedia Act 1998, in its current form (1 January 2006), consists of 11 Parts containing 282 sections and 1 schedule (including 1 amendment).
 Part I: Preliminary
 Part II: Ministerial Powers and Procedures
 Chapter 1: Ministerial Direction
 Chapter 2: Ministerial Determination
 Chapter 3: Ministerial Declaration
 Chapter 4: Ministerial Regulations
 Part III: Appeal Tribunal
 Part IV: Licences
 Chapter 1: Individual Licence
 Chapter 2: Class Licence
 Part V: Powers and Procedures of the Malaysian Communications and Multimedia Commission
 Chapter 1: Directions
 Chapter 2: Determination
 Chapter 3: Inquiry
 Chapter 4: Investigation for Purposes of Administration, Inquiry, etc.
 Chapter 5: Information-gathering Powers
 Chapter 6: Register
 Chapter 7: Notification and Resolution of Disputes
 Chapter 8: Registration of Agreements
 Chapter 9: Voluntary Industry Codes
 Chapter 10: Mandatory Standards
 Chapter 11: Undertakings
 Chapter 12: Regulatory Forbearance
 Chapter 13: Review of Decisions
 Chapter 14: Regulatory Review
 Chapter 15: Monitoring and Reporting
 Part VI: Economic Regulation
 Chapter 1: Licensing
 Chapter 2: General Competition Practices
 Chapter 3: Access to Services
 Part VII: Technical Regulation
 Chapter 1: Spectrum Assignment
 Chapter 2: Numbering and Electronic Addressing
 Chapter 3: Technical Standards
 Part VIII: Consumer Protection
 Chapter 1: Quality of Service
 Chapter 2: Required Applications Services
 Chapter 3: Resolution of Consumer Disputes
 Chapter 4: Rate Regulation
 Chapter 5: Universal Service Provision
 Part IX: Social Regulation
 Chapter 1: Licensing
 Chapter 2: Content Requirements
 Part X: General
 Chapter 1: Installation of Network Facilities, Access to Network Facilities, etc.
 Chapter 2: Additional Offences and Penalties
 Chapter 3: Powers of Entry, Investigation into Offences and Prosecution
 Chapter 4: National Interest Matters
 Chapter 5: Miscellaneous
 Part XI: Transitional Provisions
 Chapter 1: Repeal and Savings
 Chapter 2: Transitional Provisions for Licences
 Schedule

References

External links
 Communications and Multimedia Act 1998 

1998 in Malaysian law
Malaysian federal legislation